Australia competed at the 1988 Summer Paralympics in Seoul, South Korea in 16 sports, winning medals in 6 sports. Gold medals were won in three sports – athletics, lawn bowls and swimming. Australia won 95 medals – 23 gold, 34 silver and 38 bronze medals. Australia finished 10th on the gold medal table and 7th on the combined medal table. Australian Confederation of Sports for the Disabled reported another medal ranking after Games with Australia being 2nd ranked in amputee sports, 8th in wheelchair sports, 11th in blind sports and 12th in cerebral palsy sports.

Notable Australian performances included:
 Rodney Nugent, an arm amputee, won 4 gold medals and 3 bronze medals in athletics
 Elizabeth Kosmala, a wheelchair shooter, won 3 gold medals and 1 silver medal
 Dual individual gold medallists included: amputee swimmer Greg Hammond, amputee swimmer Judith Young, vision impaired thrower Russell Short and wheelchair thrower Bruce Wallrodt

Australian athletes broke eight world records.

Background 
The 1988 Summer Paralympics were the first Paralympic Games to be held under the aegis of the International Co-ordinating Committee (ICC). The ICC was accepted into the Olympic Family, which allowed greater co-operation by National Olympic Committees in regards to the organization of Paralympic Games. The Seoul Olympic Organizing Committee (SLOOC) regarded the Paralympic Games as an extension of the Olympic Games and formulated a support plan which allowed sharing of Seoul Olympic manpower, facilities, equipment, and sharing of key personnel. The SLOOC gave a subsidy of $12,857,143 US dollars. It was not possible to use the Olympic Village so a new Paralympic Village, consisting of 10 apartment blocks, was created, providing catering, recreation, banking, post office facilities, medical centres, religious centres, and a shopping mall. The 1988 Seoul Paralympic Games was also the first time both the Olympics and Paralympics used the same venues, and since then, every Winter and Summer Paralympic Games have been held in the same city as the Olympic Games.

The Seoul Paralympic Organizing Committee (SPOC) designed the first Paralympic Symbol which was used from 1988–1994. The Five 'teardrops' in the 'W' configuration and colours of the Olympic rings represented the five oceans and the five continents. This symbol was eventually changed in 1994, as it was considered to be too close to the International Olympic Committee's (IOC) 5-ring emblem. The 1988 Seoul Paralympic Games is considered as the genesis of the Modern Paralympic Games.

Opening Ceremony 

During the Opening Ceremony there were more than 75,000 people within the Olympic Stadium with a then record of 3,057 competitors from 61 nations. The President of South Korea, Roh Tae-Woo, presented the new Paralympic flag to the President of the ICC, Jens Bromann. Paul Croft, competing in his second Paralympic Games, was the flag bearer for Australia during the Opening Ceremony. Parachutists in the Paralympic colors of blue, black, red, yellow, and green swept down into the Olympic Stadium following a procession of children in wheelchairs. The Olympic Torch was carried in by a one-legged South Korean Paralympic volleyball player and handed to 19 year old Cho Hyun-hui, a wheelchair bound athlete with cerebral palsy. Cho Hyun-hai was wheeled around the stadium by her 7-year-old daughter before handing the Torch to blind runner Lee Jae-oon, who linked hands with women's handball Olympic gold medalist Kiifi Hyun-mi, who together, were carried up by elevator platform to light the Olympic Flame.

Chief Paralympic Organiser Koh Kwi-nam addressed the athletes by saying "The goal you as athletes should try to reach for in the Games is not to accomplish the Olympic slogan of 'faster, higher and farther' but to show the world your real selves as courageous challengers, glorious conquerors and impartial participants."

Controversies 
The Seoul Paralympic Games were not without controversies. The Iranian goalball team were disqualified for refusing to play against the Israeli team. It was deemed that the Iranian team had misused the sporting platform for political aims by the ICC who made immediate arrangements to send the team home. Asghar Dadkhan, the Iranian team manager, made a formal statement of apology pledging that all other Iranian athletes would compete with full regard to the regulations and would compete against Israel and any other nation.

A Libyan team arrived at the Seoul Paralympic Games without having gone through the normal entry procedures. The SPOC urged the ICC to accept the Libyan team and a compromise was reach, permitting the Libyans to participate as observers. They could compete in the marathon event, however they would not have any medal entitlement, nor would they be officially recognized at the Closing Ceremony.

Twenty-seven athletes were incorrectly awarded medals after the first round of competition in the men's and women's wheelchair slalom event. The mistake was discovered when officials realised that the medals should not have been awarded until after a second round of competition.

Team

Australia sent a team of 179 athletes and 47 staff and escorts. The Australian Confederation of Sports for the Disabled Inc took responsibility for team management and fundraising. The team was organised by disability athlete categories – amputee, blind, cerebral palsy, wheelchair (paraplegic and quadriplegic).

Team management
The Australian team was organised by disability classifications as the Games team was organised by the Australian Confederation of Sports for the Disabled Inc.

Overall – Rhys Roberts (General Manager), Nigel Rouse (Assistant General Manager), Dr John Bourke (Medical Director),  Dominic Wall (Sport Coordinator), David Douglas (Publicity Director) 
Section Managers- Wally Parsons (Amputee), Gary Prior (Blind), Judy Hill (Cerebral palsy), George Dunstan (Wheelchair) 
State Management – each Australian state provided team officials:
Australian Capital Territory – overall – Dominic Wall ; wheelchair officials – M. Trewella, G. Walker 
New South Wales – Amputee officials – D. Beath, T. Beath, Vic Renalson; blind officials – L. Alder, T. Keneghan, J. Stephenson, S. Jackson  ; cerebral palsy officials – A. Gregson, Tom Organ, S. Streat ; wheelchair officials – Michael Godfrey-Roberts, M. Bevan, C. Jarvis 
Queensland – amputee officials – Paul Bird, Henry Shorter ; blind officials – D. Beavis, J. Buckley ; cerebral palsy officials – A. Allan, A. Brindley, Karen Denman ; wheelchair officials – S. Hyde 
South Australia – overall – R. Roberts ; amputee officials – P. Aldridge, M. Parsons, W. Parsons ; wheelchair officials – Kevin Bawden, George Dunstan, G. Gould, G. Maloney, M. Wardrop 
Northern Territory – overall – N. Rouse ; blind official – B. Killalea 
Tasmania – wheelchair official – G. Vince 
Victoria – overall – John Bourke ; amputee official – P. Negropontis ; blind officials – J. Coole, E. O'Meagher ; wheelchair officials – Kathryn Lee, D. Perriman, J. Sayers 
Western Australia – blind official – G. Prior ; cerebral palsy officials – G. Carter, D. Hancy, J. Hill, P. Jose, B. Lake, M. Chan ; wheelchair official – Norma Beer

The team captain was Paul Croft who carried the flag at the Opening Ceremony and Mike Nugent was the vice captain.

Fundraising
The Australian Confederation of Sports for the Disabled Inc undertook a range of fundraising activities to raise A$2 million of which A$1.w million would be used to send teams to the 1988 Seoul Summer and Innsbruck Winter Games. The remainder of the funds would be used for future Games. The cash amount finally raised was A$1,104,328. There were also considerable "in kind" donations covering accommodation, marketing, travel.

Medalists

| width="78%" align="left" valign="top" |

| width="22%" align="left" valign="top" |

Events

Archery

Selected team of 3 athletes.

Australia did not win any medals.

Men

Women

Athletics

Selected team of 73 athletes.

Athletics was Australia's most successful sport at the Games winning 53 medals – 14 gold, 19 silver and 20 bronze medals. 13 athletes won gold medals. Rodney Nugent won 4 gold medals, 3 bronze medals and set a world record of 6.72m in his long jump event. Four athletes came home with two gold medals – Adrian Lowe, Nigel Parsons, Russell Short and Bruce Wallrodt.

Deahnne McIntyre won a gold medal, two silver medals and a bronze medal, competing a week after undergoing an emergency appendectomy in a Seoul hospital. With doctors and officials telling her that she could not compete, McIntyre 'knew that she would be out there'. McIntyre came into the games as the world record holder for the Women's 200m 5-6 classification, which she eventually won the gold medal for.

Russell Short, a blind athlete, won two gold medals and a bronze medal. Short set a world record in his classification for javelin, making a throw of 54.72m.

Dubbed 'The Awesome Foursome', Australia's 4 × 400 m relay team set a world record time of 3 minutes 55 seconds, beating the previous record by 3.9 seconds and winning the race by 50 metres.

Patricia Molseed set a Paralympic Record of 8.82m in the Women's Shot Put B1 competition on her first throw despite suffering from a torn back muscle. Only able to make token efforts after her back gave out, her first throw was enough to clinch the gold medal.

Track events – men 

Track events – women

Field events – men

Field events – women 

Results key
 Note – Ranks given for track events are within the athlete's heat only
 Q = Qualified for the next round
 WR = World record
 PR = Paralympic record
 N/A = Round not applicable for the event

Boccia

Selected team of 4 athletes.

Australia did not win any medals.

Cycling

Selected team of 1 athlete.

Australia did not win any medals.

Football 7-a-side

The Football 7-a-side tournament was made up of 5 teams competing in a round robin tournament. Australia selected team of 9 athletes.

Australia lost to the Netherlands 18-1, lost to Belgium 6-1, lost to Ireland 5–1 and lost to Korea 4-0. Australia did not win a medal.

Round Robin Tournament

Goalball

Australia represented by:

Australian men's results were – defeated Denmark 1-0, defeated South Korea 5-4, lost to Yugoslavia 0-1, lost to USA 2-3, lost to Italy 0-1, defeated Bulgaria 3-2 and lost to Canada 4-5. Australia beat the Netherlands in the 11th place playoff game. 

Australian women's results were – defeated Great Britain 3-0, lost to Germany 2-6, lost to United States 0-6, lost to Denmark 0-4, lost to Netherlands 1-5, lost to 2-5 Canada and lost to South Korea 4-5.

Australia did not win any medals.

Men

Women

Lawn Bowls

Selected team of 11 athletes.

Australia won 1 gold medal, 1 silver medal and 2 bronze medals. Roy Fowler was competing in his sixth Paralympic Games, winning his 10th medal.

Powerlifting

Australia were represented by two athletes, Matthew Pobje and Michael Farrell who won silver and bronze respectively.

Shooting

Selected team of 8 athletes.

Elizabeth Kosmala won all Australia's shooting medals – 3 gold medals and one silver medal.

Men

Women

Team

Snooker

Australia was represented by John Hunt and Michael Quinn. Hunt finished 2nd in Pool A and Quinn finished 3rd in Pool C. Neither athlete qualified for the semifinals.

Swimming

Selected team of 25 athletes.

Australia won 5 gold, 12 silver and 14 bronze medals. Greg Hammond won two gold medals and Sandra Yaxley won one gold medal.

Judith Young won two gold medals and three silver medals. After winning gold in the 100m backstroke and 400m freestyle, The United States of America and Great Britain, protested that Young was swimming in the wrong category and should be reclassified from amputee to Les Autres. After winning both events in a world record time, the protest was upheld and Young was re-classified in the Les Autres category. Both world record times were scratched from the record books but Young was able to keep both the gold medals and a silver she won in the 100m breaststroke. She would go on to win two more medals in her new classification.

Men

Qualification Legend: Q= Qualified for final; PR= Paralympic Record; WR= World Record

Women

Qualification Legend: Q= Qualified for final; WR= World Record

Table Tennis

Selected team of 9 athletes.

Australia did not win any medals.

Men

Women

Weightlifting

Selected team of 5 athletes.

Australia won a bronze medal through Brian McNicholl's performance.

Wheelchair Basketball

The Australian Men's Wheelchair Basketball team was placed in Group B with Argentina, France, Germany and Morocco. Australia lost to France 49-61, lost to Germany 27-43, defeated Argentina 54-36 and defeated Morocco 88-21. Australia finished third in their group and 10th overall, losing to Belgium in the 9th place playoff game.  

Group Stage

Classification 9-16

Wheelchair Fencing

Australia was represented by two athletes, Robert Goodwin and Robert Jordan. Neither athlete advanced out of the pool rounds.

Wheelchair Tennis

Wheelchair tennis was a demonstration sport and the medals awarded were not included in the overall medal tally. Mick Connell was the sole representative for Australia and was runner up in the men's singles.

See also
 Australia at the Paralympics
 1988 Summer Paralympics

Further reading
 '88 Paralympics Appeal Report
 Russell Short interviewed by Nikki Henningham in the Australian Centre for Paralympic Studies oral history project, National Library of Australia, 2012
 David Gould interviewed by Nikki Henningham in the Australian Centre for Paralympic Studies oral history project, National Library of Australia, 2010
 Libby Kosmala interviewed by Nikki Henningham in the Australian Centre for Paralympic Studies oral history project, Nationaal Library of Australia, 2010
 Chris Scott interviewed by Ian Jobling in the Australian Centre for Paralympic Studies oral history project, National Library of Australia, 2011
 Norma Beer interviewed by Ian Jobling in the Australian Centre for Paralympic Studies oral history project, National Library of Australia, 2011
 Paul Bird interviewed by Ian Jobling in the Australian Centre for Paralympic Studies oral history project, National Library of Australia, 2011

References 

Nations at the 1988 Summer Paralympics
1988
Paralympics